West Bengal Legislative Council was the upper house of the bicameral legislature of the Indian state of West Bengal, which came into existence in 1952.

Abolition
The Council was abolished in 1969. The West Bengal Legislative Assembly passed the resolution for the abolition of the Legislative Council on 21 March 1969. Later the Parliament of India passed the West Bengal Legislative Council (Abolition) Act, 1969 for abolishing the Legislative Council with effect from 1 August 1969.

Revival Attempt
Trinamool Congress government planned to revive the council.

References

Government of West Bengal
1969 disestablishments in India
State upper houses in India
Defunct upper houses in India
Political history of West Bengal
1952 establishments in West Bengal